Jean Max Tixier (1935 in Marseille – 30 September 2009) was a French poet.

Life
Jean Max Tixier studied at the collège Victor-Hugo, before attending the lycée Thiers of Marseille.

He taught at the Lycée Agricole de Hyères.

He was Correspondent Member of the European Art Center (EUARCE) of Greece (2004)

He was a member of the Editorial Board of journals "Autre Sud" (after the journal "Sud" 1970-1996), "Encres Vives", and "Poésie 1 Vagabondages".

Awards
 1992 Campion-Guillaumet Prize by SGDL, for Etats du lieu
 1994 Provence Grand Prize of Literature
 1995 Antonin Artaud Prize, for L’oiseau de glaise
 2009 Mallarmé prize

Bibliography
 Chants de l'évidence Autres Temps (2009) 
 Le grenier à sel Encres vives (2008)
 Les silences du passeur Le Taillis pré (2006)
 Le temps des mots Pluie d'étoiles éditions (2004)

English translations
 "Praise for the Ferryman"; "Writings"; "Three Fables Without a Moral", The Chariton Review, Vol. 31, No. 2

Collections and chapbooks
 Passage, avec Youl, tirage limité à 3 exemplaires, 2005
 Stances à la demme dernière, éd. Alain Benoît, 2005
 Fragments de l'obscur/Frammenti dal buio, bilingual édition
 Campanotto Editore, Passian di Prato, 2004
 Le Temps des mots, éd. Pluie d'étoiles, 2004
 Requiem pour un silence, éd. La Porte, 2003
 Profils de chutes et autres partitions, éd. Telo Martius, 2003
 Le manteau de circé, ed Le Taillis Pré, 2003
 Jardin ou peut-être jardin, Alain Benoît, 2003
 Double marée, collection Pli dirigée par Daniel Leuwers, 2002
 Fragments de l'obscur, éd. Associatives Clapas, 2002
 Chasseur de mémoire, Le Cherche-mid, 2001   
 Aphrorismes du silence, collection Le Livre d'argile, 2001
 Le Temps des guêpes, éd. Tipaza, 2000
 Où s'invente le jour, éd. Associatives Clapas, 2000
 L'imprécation du silence, éd. Cogito, 1999
 Recitativ de Sare, traduit du roumain, éd. Libra, 1999
 Petites histoires de la mer, éd. Pluie d'étoiles, 1999
 Scènes des songes quotidiens, éd. Associatives Clapas, 1998
 Questions de climat, éd. Autres Temps, 1997
 L’oiseau de glaise,  Arcantère, 1995. 
 L’instant précaire, L’arbre à paroles, 1995
 Le Roseau Noir, éd. L'Atelier des Grames, 1994
 Espace d'un jardin, éd. Associatives Clapas, 1993
 Etats du lieu, Autres Temps, 1992.
 Vertige Camaieu, éd. Telo Martieus, 1991
 L’arrière-temps, La Table rase, le Noroît, 1989
 Silence ombre portée, éd. Encres vives, 1987
 La Traversée des eaux, Sud, 1984
 Etats des lieux, Ed Sud, 1984
 Demeure sous les eaux, éd. L'Atelier des Grames, 1983
 Ouverture du delta, éd. Encres vives, 1980
 Lecture d’une ville, Sud, 1976
 Design, éd. Encres vives, 1973
 Mesure de la soif, éd. Encres vives, 1970
 En guise de paroles, éd. Encres vives, 1970
 La pierre hypnotisée, éd. Les Nouveaux Cahiers de "Jeunesse", 1968
 La vague immédiate, éd. Mic Berthe, 1967
 La pousse des choses, éd. Encres vives, 1967

Young Adult
 Petites histoires de la mer, Pluie d’étoiles, 1999

Novels
 
 L'Homme chargé d'octobres, le Cherche-midi, 2005  
 La fiancée du santonnier, Les Presses de la cité, 2002
 Le crime des Hautes Terres, Les Presses de la Cité, 2001
 Le jardin d’argile, le Cherche-midi, 1997

Anthologies
 La Poésie française contemporaine, éd. Cogito, 2004
 Joyaux au sud / Juvaere din sud, traduit du roumain, éd. Cogito, 2004
 Poètes de sud, éd. Rijois, 1978

Essays
 Vers une logoqie poétique, éd. La Table Rase, 1980

References

External links
"Jean-Max Tixier", Passion du livre

1935 births
2009 deaths
French male poets
20th-century French poets
20th-century French male writers